The 2022 BAL Playoffs was the second edition of the playoffs of the Basketball Africa League (BAL) and was the concluding tournament of the 2022 BAL season. The playoffs began on 21 May 2022 and ended on 28 May 2022 with the Finals. For a second consecutive season, all playoffs games were played at the BK Arena in Kigali, Rwanda.

The official schedule was announced on 8 February 2022.

Quarterfinals
All times are in the local Greenwich Mean Time (GMT).

Petro de Luanda vs. AS Salé
Petro de Luanda and AS Salé were meeting each other in the BAL for the third time. It was a re-match of the 2021 quarterfinals that was won by Petro. Petro de Luanda scored 19 three-pointers on its way to a blowout against Salé, leading by as much as 28 points in the third quarter.

REG vs. FAP 
The two teams never faced each other before. In a record attendance of 7,576, FAP surprisingly beat REG as the host team had 25 turnovers in the game. FAP led by as much as 52–39 in the third quarter, before REG cut back the deficit in the final quarter. Olivier Shyaka scored a three-pointer with 4:30 minutes left to bring FAP's lead to one.

US Monastir vs. Cape Town Tigers  
The two teams have never faced each other before. Monastir defeated Cape Town comfortably, never trailing in the game. With a margin of 39 points, it was the largest win in the BAL season.

Zamalek vs. SLAC 
The two teams have never faced each other before. SLAC made its playoffs debut without its top scorer from the group phase, Chris Crawford, who signed in Syria. SLAC's rebounding leader Chris Obekpa missed the game due to injury.

Semifinals

Petro de Luanda vs. FAP 
The teams played each other before in the group phase of the 2021 season, with Petro winning the game 66–64.

US Monastir vs. Zamalek 
The game was a re-match of the 2021 BAL Finals, in which Zamalek won the inaugural season title.

Third place game

Finals

Elevate Showcase
The BAL organised a showcase game between Elevate program players of the NBA Academy Africa and the Rwandan national under-23 team.

Notes

References

Basketball Africa League
playoffs
BAL
BAL
Sport in Kigali